Bernard Ollis (born 1951 in Bath, England) is an Australian artist and painter who lives and works in Sydney and Paris. Ollis is the former director of the National Art School, Sydney.

Born in Bath, England, Ollis is a graduate of Cardiff School of Art & Design, Wales and received his Master of Art (Painting) from the Royal College of Art. Ollis arrived in Australia in 1976 and lectured at the University of the Northern Territory, where he became head of his department, and La Trobe University, Victoria where he became Head of Fine Art.  In 1996, Ollis was appointed Head of Painting at the National Art School, Sydney. He became Director there in late 1997, a position he held for 10 years.

Ollis has held over 60 solo exhibitions since 1972 in Australia, New Zealand, and London, and has participated in group exhibitions throughout Australia, Europe, and Asia. Ollis undertook a residency at the Cite Internationale des Arts, Paris in 1975 and in 2008 he underwent a Residency as the guest of the Australian Ambassador to Egypt, Dr Bob Bowker. Subsequent residencies include the Obracadobra artist residency in Oaxaca City, Mexico, with Mawson's Huts Foundation to Antarctica in 2014, and an international artist residency at Funxing-Ginger Art Space, Zhouzhuang, Jiangsu, China in 2015.

Ollis received the 1976 John Minton International Painting Prize, the 1977 Sir Frederick Richards’ Travelling Scholarship (UK), an Australia Council Visual Arts Board Grant (1984), and the Conrad Jupiters Award in 2005 (Gold Coast City Art Gallery QLD). Ollis's work is currently held in public collections in Australia and the United Kingdom, including the Royal College of Art London, National Gallery of Australia, Parliament House, Canberra, and the State Galleries of Queensland, Victoria and Northern Territory. His partner is artist Wendy Sharpe.

Selected solo exhibitions 
 2019 Departures, Aarwun, Canberra
2019 The Traveller, Mitchell Fine Art Gallery, Brisbane
2018 Bernard Ollis, Anala Art Advisory, Glenbrook, Blue Mountains
2018 Being There, Harvey Galleries, Mosman & Seaforth, Sydney
2018 Traveler's Tales: Paris and Morocco, Linton & Kay Galleries, Perth
 2017 Paris and Other Stories, Aarwun Galleries, Canberra
 2017 Observations, Mitchell Galleries Brisbane (May)
 2017 Favourite Places, Harvey Galleries Seaforth and Mosman, Sydney
 2016 Run Ya Artspace Linyi China
 2016 Cultural Exchange of Australia and China, Linyi Arts Centre Shandong
 2016 Storytelling about China – Shanghai Cultural Centre & Art Gallery China
 2016 Open Studio – Travel Paintings, Linton and Kay Galleries, Perth WA
 2016 Travels to Paris, Trevor Victor Harvey Gallery, Seaforth, Sydney NSW
 2015 Brisbane and Beyond, Mike Mitchell Fine Art Gallery, Brisbane, Queensland
 2015 Bernard Ollis: 54 Works at Michael Reid Gallery, Berlin, Germany
 2015 Observations of Paris, NG Gallery, Sydney
 2015 Theatre of Life, Buratti Fine Art, Perth, WA
 2015 Antarctica- Shackleton, The Australian National Maritime Museum, Sydney
 2014 Bernard Ollis, Kenthurst Galleries, NSW 2014 Le Regard de deux Australiens, L’Espace Beaujon, Paris, France
 2014 Traveller’s Tales, Tweed River Regional Gallery, NSW
 2013 A Town Like Paris, Muk Muk Fine Art, travelling show to Alice Springs, Darwin, Brisbane
 2013 Paris Work, Buratti Fine Art, Perth 2012 – 13	Modern Living: Bernard Ollis. A survey of the work of Bernard Ollis, Manly Art Gallery and Museum, Sydney
 2012 Paris Considered, NG Art Gallery, Sydney 2012	Parisian Reflections, Letham Galleries, Auckland, NZ
 2011 Paris Revisited, NG Art Gallery, Sydney
 2011 Major Works, Buratti Fine Art, Perth
 2010 Italy 19Karen Contemporary Artspace Gold Coast, Queensland
 2009 The Grand Tour, United Galleries Perth WA
 2009 Journeys through Italy and Egypt, NG Art Sydney NSW 2008	Urban Myth, United Galleries Perth WA
 2008 Incognito NG Art, Chippendale Sydney NSW
 2006 The St Peters Suite Michael Nagy Fine Art, Sydney NSW
 2002 Stella Downer Galleries, Sydney NSW
 2001 Michael Nagy Fine Art, Sydney NSW
 2000 Michael Nagy Fine Art, Sydney NSW
 1998 Mary Place Gallery, Sydney NSW
 1998 Sydney Theatre Company, Sydney NSW
 1997 Hot Bath Gallery, Bath UK
 1996 Australian Galleries, Melbourne Victoria
 1994 Bendigo Art Gallery, Victoria
 1993 Botanical Gallery, South Yarra Victoria
 1992 Retrospective Paintings and Pastels Macquarie Gallery, Sydney NSW
 1991 Powell Street Gallery, South Yarra Victoria 1990	Macquarie Gallery, Sydney NSW
 1989 Macquarie Gallery, Sydney NSW
 1988 Macquarie Gallery, Sydney NSW
 1998 Roz McAllen Gallery, Brisbane Queensland
 1987 Macquarie Gallery, Sydney NSW Powell Street Gallery, South Yarra Victoria
 1984–1986 Visual Arts Board, “Bernard Ollis” The Australian Tour; exhibited at:
 Under croft Gallery for the Perth Festival
 University of Western Australia
 Hawthorn City Art Gallery, Victoria
 Warrnambool Art Gallery, Victoria
 Ararat Gallery, Victoria
 Mildura Arts Centre, Victoria
 Shepparton Regional Art Gallery, Victoria
 Muswellbrook Art Gallery, NSW
 Bathurst Regional Gallery, NSW
 Orange Art Gallery, NSW
 Benalla Art Gallery Victoria
 Wagga Wagga Art Gallery, NSW
 Bendigo Art Gallery Victoria (extended survey exhibition)
 1984 Macquarie Gallery, Sydney NSW
 1982 Macquarie Gallery, Sydney NSW
 1981 Macquarie Gallery, Sydney NSW
 1978 Warehouse Galleries, South Melbourne Victoria
 1976 The Africa Centre Covent Garden, London UK
 1976 The Royal Commonwealth Society, London UK
 1974–1975 Commonwealth Institute Gallery, London UK
 1972–1973 College of Art Gallery, Cardiff Wales

Selected group exhibitions 
 2018 'Nature and Life: Images from our Souls', Bayside Arts Festival, Sydney
 2017 'Salon des Refuses', S.H. Ervin, Sydney
 2017 'Bernard Ollis & Wendy Sharpe', Firestation Print Studio, Melbourne
 2016 Blue Mountains Cultural Centre, NSW
 2015 'Three Australians', Gallery 12, Auckland NZ
 2015 'New Romantics (with Wendy Sharpe and Johnny Romeo)', Penny Contemporary Gallery, Hobart, Tasmania
 2015 'Private Lives: Collections', S.H. Ervin Gallery, Sydney
 2011 'Dobell Prize', Art Gallery of New South Wales, Sydney
 2011 I'N[TWO]ART', Maitland Regional Art Gallery touring exhibition
 2010 'Salon des Refuses', S.H. Ervin Gallery, Sydney
 2010 ‘Tales from the City’, Two person exhibition with Wendy Sharpe, Orange Regional Art Gallery
 2009 ‘Every Dog has its Day’, Letham Gallery Auckland NZ
 2008 United Galleries, Perth WA
 2008 Contemporary Drawing London University of the Arts Wimbledon Art Col, England
 2008 ‘Vernissage’ Oxford Street Gallery, Melbourne Victoria
 2008 ‘Drawcard’ National Art School Gallery, Sydney New South Wales
 2007  ‘Fragile Planet’ NG Art Gallery, Sydney New South Wales
 2007 ‘Salon des Refuses’ SH Ervin Gallery, New South Wales
 2007 SCEGGS Redlands Art Prize
 2007 Mosman Art Prize
 2007 ‘There is no place like home’ NG Art Gallery, Sydney New South Wales
 2006 Hong Ik University Gallery, Seoul South Korea
 2005 ‘Drawcard’ Cell Block Theatre National Art School, Sydney New South Wales
 2005 ‘Dog Trumpet’ Michael Nagy Gallery, Sydney New South Wales
 2005 ‘Drawing the Line’ Cell Block Theatre National Art School (academic staff exhibition)
 2005 Art Space, Bendigo Victoria
 2005 Lake Macquarie Invitation Prize, University Gallery Sydney NSW

Awards and prizes 
 2015 Artist Residency in Zhouzhang, China
 2014 Mawson’s Hut Foundation artist-in-residence, Antarctica voyage
 2008 Australian Embassy, Artist-in-Residence Studio, Cairo Egypt
 2005 Conrad Jupiter Art Prize Gold Coast City Art Gallery Queensland
 2000 Olympic Arts Festival 1992	Selected by Melbourne Theatre Company for season’s brochure
 1989 Selected for Sydney Children’s Choir catalogue
 1988 Heritage Arts Festival Award, Queensland
 1984 Visual Arts Board Australia, Council Grant
 1983 Commissioned series of paintings for Napoleon Brandy Advertising Campaign
 1982 Gold Coast City Art Awards, Queensland
 1977 Sir Fredrick Richards’s Travelling Scholarship (drawing), UK
 1976 John Minton International Painting Prize, London UK
 1975 Artist-in-residence Maltese Studio International Youth Arts Festival British representative
 1975 Artist-in-residence Paris Studio Cité internationale des arts

Institutional lecturer 
 1998–2009 Director National Art School (Sydney)
 1997–1998 Head of Studies National Art School (Sydney)
 1996–1997 Head of Painting Department National Art School (Sydney)
 1994–1996 Senior Lecturer/Head of Fine Art La Trobe University (Victoria)
 1982–1994 Head of Painting La Trobe University (Victoria)
 1982  Acting Head of Visual Art Department Darwin Community College (University Northern Territory)
 1978–1982 Head of Painting, Drawing and Sculpture Section Darwin Community College (University Northern Territory)
 1977–1978 Lecturer Fine Art Darwin Community College (University Northern Territory)
 1974–1976 Visiting Lecturer Various British Art Schools

Collections 
In the Permanent Collection of:

 Australian National Gallery, Canberra
 National Gallery of Victoria, Melbourne
 Queensland Art Gallery, Brisbane 
 Museum and Art Gallery of the Northern Territory 
 The Royal College of Art London, UK 
 Parliament House, Canberra 
 The Commonwealth Institute, London, UK 
 Art Bank, Sydney
 Royal Melbourne Institute of Technology, Victoria
 La Trobe University, Melbourne  
 Darwin University, Northern Territory 
 McGregor Collection University of Southern Queensland, Toowoomba 
 Gold Coast City Art Gallery, Surfers Paradise, Queensland 
 Herald Sun Art Collection, Melbourne
 Bathurst Arts Centre, Bathurst
 New England Regional Art Museum, Armidale 
 Orange Regional Art Gallery, Orange 
 Grafton Regional Gallery, Grafton 
 Ballarat Art Gallery and Museum, Ballarat 
 Bendigo Art Gallery, Bendigo

External links
 www.bernardollis.com

References

Living people
1951 births
Australian contemporary artists
Artists from Sydney
Australian painters